Poekilocerus pictus is a large brightly coloured grasshopper found in the Indian subcontinent. Nymphs of the species are notorious for squirting a jet of liquid up to several inches away when grasped.

Description

The half-grown immature form is greenish-yellow with fine black markings and small crimson spots. The  mature grasshopper has canary yellow and turquoise stripes on its body, green tegmina with yellow spots, and pale red hind wings.

It changes its outward appearance by molting.

Habits
The grasshopper feeds on the poisonous plant Calotropis gigantea.

Upon slight pinching of the head or abdomen, the half-grown immature form ejects liquid in a sharp and sudden jet, with a range of two inches or more, from a dorsal opening between the first and second abdominal segments. The discharge is directed towards the pinched area and may be repeated several times. The liquid is pale and milky, slightly viscous and bad-tasting, containing cardiac glycosides that the insect obtains from the plant it feeds upon.

In the adult, the discharge occurs under the tegmina and collects as viscous bubbly heap along the sides of the body.

It is known based on the main food plant as Aak grasshopper or locally in few tribal areas called titighodo.

Research

P. pictus females produce a sex pheromone that is secreted from a thin sac-like gland in the metathoracic segment.

P. pictus has an inducible chromosomal repair mechanism that acts in meiotic cells.

References

Pyrgomorphidae
Insects described in 1775
Taxa named by Johan Christian Fabricius